Spyros Kokotos (Greek: Σπύρος Κοκοτός) is a Greek architect born in the city of Herakleion, Crete on October 30, 1933, to (father) Fotis (Greek: Φώτης) a.k.a. "Takis" (Greek: Τάκης) Kokotos and (mother) Anna Varouha (Greek: Αννα Βαρούχα).

Education
Spyros Kokotos spent his childhood in the village of Dafnes, approx. 15 km south of the city of Herakleion, while attending secondary education at the "Lyceum Korais" (Greek: Λύκειον "Ο Κοραής"). He was admitted to the School of Architecture of the National Technical University of Athens (Greek: Εθνικό Μετσόβιο Πολυτεχνείο) in 1953.

Military service
In 1959, Spyros Kokotos was drafted  in the Hellenic Navy and received a military commission as an ensign (Greek: Επίκουρος Σημαιοφόρος) in December 1959. He was stationed at the naval port of Souda in his native Crete, where he served in Naval Public Works (Greek: Δημόσια Ναυτικά Έργα) until July 1960. He was then transferred to the navy's Hydrographic Office (Greek: Υδρογραφική Υπηρεσία), where he served until May 1961, when he was again transferred to the "Officers' Autonomous Building Society" (Greek: "Α.Ο.Ο.Α." Αυτόνομος Οικοδομικός Οργανισμός Αξιωματικών) and was charged with architectural work on the expansion of the "General Papagos" suburb (Greek: οικισμός Στρατηγού Παπάγου) in Athens. In April 1962, he received extensive leave from the navy, and was finally discharged in 1982.

Professional career
Even while still attending university, Spyros Kokotos worked as a junior architect on the Athens Hilton project, so since graduation he has been mainly involved with tourism projects, having built more than 40 hotels throughout Greece.

Collaborating closely with his brother George Kokotos, a civil engineer, they designed and built a number of hotels on the island of Rhodes, including the Esperia hotel (200 units) and Aura hotel (150 units), culminating in the design and construction of the Rodos Bay hotel (currently known as Amathus Beach Hotel) with 260 rooms and suites, and 60 bungalows.

Other early hotel projects in the early 1960s include the El Greco hotel (120 units) and Emmanuel N. Foundoulaki's Esperia hotel S.A. (53 units) in Herakleion, Crete, the Hermes hotel in Aghios Nikolaos, Crete (250 units), and the Arcadio and Olympic hotels on the island of Corfu.

Having established a reputation as one of the country's finest architects for hotels, Spyros Kokotos also designed in the late 1960s the Club Med hotel on the island of Kos, the Poseidon Hotel in Loutraki, and the Minos Palace hotel in Aghios Nikolaos, Crete.

Personal Achievements
Spyros Kokotos is more widely recognised for and accredited with the creation of the luxurious hotels and resorts of Elounda in his native Crete. He has designed and built the following 5* hotels in the region: Elounda Beach (completed 1971, sold 1988), Elounda Bay (completed 1977, sold 1978), Elounda Mare (first operation 1981, owned to the present day), Porto Elounda (first operation 1993, owned to the present day), Elounda Peninsula (completed 2002, still being expanded, owned to the present day).

Spyros Kokotos is also one of the founding members and first president of the Association of Greek Tourism Enterprises (Greek: Σύνδεσμος Ελληνικών Τουριστικών Επιχειρήσεων - ΣΕΤΕ, transliterated "SETE"), and the main driving force behind all its policies. SETE is now widely recognised as the main influence behind Greek tourism policy, acting as a preferred partner to the Greek government.

Family Status
Spyros Kokotos is married since 1973 with Eliana Kokotos (Greek: Ελιάνα Κοκοτού), born Sotirchou (Greek: Σωτήρχου) and has three children: Fotis (Greek: Φώτης) Kokotos, born 14-June-1974, Ilias (Greek: Ηλίας) Kokotos, born 9-October-1975, and Marina (Greek: Μαρίνα) Kokotou (Greek: Κοκοτού), born 14-November-1980. He has one brother, George Kokotos (Greek: Γιώργος Κοκοτός).

References

External links
 Article about Elounda hotels and Spyros Kokotos on Travel Intelligence
 Article about Elounda Mare hotel and Spyros Kokotos on Travel Intelligence
 Article about Six Senses Spa and Spyros Kokotos on Spa Finder
 Article about Elounda and Spyros Kokotos in the Independent daily British newspaper
 Article in French website Les Restos about Elounda Mare hotel and Spyros Kokotos
 Article in golf investment website Invgolf about the state of the sport in Greece and Spyros Kokotos's contribution

National Technical University of Athens alumni
Living people
Greek architects
Year of birth missing (living people)
People from Heraklion